Dunyapur is a tehsil of the Lodhran District of Punjab, Pakistan. It is situated on the bank of the Bahawalpur road. Adda Zakhira is Situated on its East side, Multan on the west side, Lodhran city, and Bahawalpur city are situated on the south side. According to the Pakistan Population Data Dunyapur City has a population of approx 500,000. Major Castes are Awan, Arain,Gujjar,Jutt and Rajpoot.

References

Populated places in Lodhran District